Airliners.net is an aviation website that includes an extensive photo database of aircraft and airports, as well as a forum catering to aviation enthusiasts. Created by Johan Lundgren, Jr., the site originated in 1996 as Pictures of Modern Airliners. It was acquired by Demand Media (now known as Leaf Group) in 2007 and underwent a major redesign in 2016.

History
Johan Lundgren, Jr., an IT student/aviation enthusiast attending Luleå University of Technology in Sweden, created the site Pictures of Modern Airliners in 1996. Lundgren had been working on the site during his military service. It initially hosted only his own aircraft photos before a new section was created for other photographers to upload their photos.

In 1997, Lundgren transitioned to a new site entitled Airliners.net and established a web server in his dormitory room. Three more servers were added, and eventually all servers were relocated to the computer rooms at the university. Lundgren started investing all of his time into the site, although he received help from a growing number of volunteers.

On 27 July 2007, Lundgren announced that the site would be acquired by Demand Media. It was sold to the company for US$8.2 million. Reasons behind the decision included the difficulty of managing the rapidly growing site, which was by that point supported by 25 servers.

A revamped site was launched on 14 June 2016.

In February 2017, the site was acquired by VerticalScope, majority-owned by Torstar.

Membership
The site offers free membership, using online advertising instead as a source of revenue. Before the June 2016 redesign, Airliners.net provided three levels of membership: the Photographer Account, Premium Membership and First Class Membership. The latter two required payment while a Photographer Account could be created for free.

Features
The site has two main features: the photo database and the forum. The database contains over 2.7 million photos with over 8.6 billion total views as of June 2016. All photos undergo screening prior to being admitted to the database, which can be searched by various factors including aircraft type, the airport at which the photo was taken and the aircraft registration. The forum is divided into ten subforums: Civil Aviation; Travel, Polls & Preferences; Technical/Operations; Aviation Hobby; Aviation Photography; Photography Feedback; Trip Reports; Military Aviation & Space Flight; Non-Aviation; and Site Related. Airliners.net also offers a complimentary newsletter service and a database of information on aircraft types developed with the help of Aerospace Publications.

See also
 List of Internet forums

References

External links
Airliners.net

Internet properties established in 1997
Online databases
Aviation websites
Aviation Internet forums